Suman Devi Thoudam is an Indian field hockey player from Imphal, Manipur. She has represented India internationally and plays the position of a defender. She has played 11 international matches as of July 2018.

Early life 
Suman Devi Thoudam hails from Singjamei Monkhanglambi in Imphal, from the state of Manipur. Born in 1998, she is the oldest daughter of Thoudam Anand. She started her hockey career at a young age, participating in inter-school tournaments in Delhi and in Amritsar in 2011, as well as larger state tournaments like the Sub Junior National in Patna in 2011 and Jawaharlal Nehru Tournaments in 2013 (runners up) and in 2012 (runners up).

She continued to represent her state for the next few years in junior tournaments, and participated in Sub Junior National in Pune 2014 (winner), Sub Junior National Bhopal 2013 (runners up), Junior National 2014 in Mysore (runners up), Junior National 2013 in Ranchi (runners up) and Sub Junior Zonal in Mumbai.

Career 
From national tournaments, Suman moved on to representing her country internationally. She was a part of the Indian youth hockey team which won the World Youth Hockey Tournament (under-18) held in Netherlands on 11 and 12 August 2014, for which she was felicitated by her old training institute, the South East Youth Organisation. She also participated in the Asia Cup 2017, where her contribution led to India building a strong defence and conceding only 5 goals in the 6-match tournament, and eventually going on to win the tournament as continental champions and earning them a qualifying spot at the Hockey World Cup.

In the run-up to the Hockey World Cup 2018 in London, the Indian women's hockey team participated in the Spain Tour where they played five matches against the Spanish National team starting 12 June 2018. Suman was a part of the 20-member squad of the Spain Tour, which defeated the host Spanish team 4–1 in the 5-match series. However, she was not chosen to be a part of the final World Cup squad.

Suman was also a part of the Indian junior women's hockey team, and participated in the Under-23 Six Nations Tournament held between 14 and 21 July 2018 in Antwerp, Belgium.

References

External links
 Suman Devi Thoudam at Hockey India

Living people
1999 births
People from Imphal
Indian female field hockey players
Field hockey players from Manipur
Sportswomen from Manipur